John Bonar (July 10, 1886 – March 28, 1963) was an American set decorator, who was born somewhere in the Balkans. He was nominated for an Academy Award in the category Best Art Direction for the film The Picture of Dorian Gray.

Selected filmography
 The Picture of Dorian Gray (1945)

References

External links

1886 births
1963 deaths
American set decorators
American emigrants